Asciodema is a genus of true bugs belonging to the family Miridae.

The species of this genus are found in Europe.

Species
Species:
 Asciodema obsoletum (Fieber, 1864) (= A. obsoleta)
 Asciodema inconspicua Uhler, 1893 accepted as Brooksetta inconspicua (Uhler, 1893)

References

Miridae genera
Phylini